The Nova Scotia Oilers were a minor professional ice hockey team in the American Hockey League based in Halifax, Nova Scotia from 1984 to 1988. The Oilers played their home games at the Halifax Metro Centre, and were the AHL affiliate of the Edmonton Oilers, whose logo theirs resembled.

The Oilers played four seasons before moving on. Larry Kish coached the first three seasons, followed by Ron Low in the fourth season. After the 1987–88 season, the team was relocated to Sydney, Nova Scotia becoming the Cape Breton Oilers. The void the Oilers left in Halifax was filled by the Halifax Citadels.

Season-by-season results
Regular season

Playoffs

Notable NHL alumni
List of Nova Scotia Oilers alumni who played more than 100 games in Nova Scotia and 100 or more games in the National Hockey League.

See also
List of ice hockey teams in Nova Scotia
Sports teams in Halifax, Nova Scotia

Defunct ice hockey teams in Canada
Edmonton Oilers minor league affiliates
Ice hockey teams in Nova Scotia
Sport in Halifax, Nova Scotia
Ice hockey clubs established in 1984
Ice hockey clubs disestablished in 1988
1984 establishments in Nova Scotia
1988 disestablishments in Nova Scotia